Labdia antinopa is a moth in the family Cosmopterigidae. It is found in Sri Lanka.

References

External links
Natural History Museum Lepidoptera generic names catalog

Labdia
Moths described in 1917